Mark W. Spong (born November 5, 1952 in Warren, Ohio) is an American roboticist. He is a Professor of Systems Engineering and Electrical and Computer Engineering in the Erik Jonsson School of Engineering & Computer Science  at the University of Texas at Dallas (UTD). He served as Dean of the Jonsson School and the Lars Magnus Ericsson Chair in Electrical Engineering from 2008-2017. Before he joined UTD, he was the Donald Biggar Willett Professor of Engineering, Professor of Electrical Engineering, Research Professor of Coordinated Science Laboratory and Information Trust Institute, and Director of Center for Autonomous Engineering Systems and Robotics at the University of Illinois at Urbana-Champaign.

Spong is a Life Fellow of the Institute of Electrical and Electronics Engineers (IEEE). He has received numerous awards for his research and teaching, including
 the 2020 Rufus Oldenburger Medal from the American Society of Mechanical Engineers
 the 2018 Bode Lecture Prize from the IEEE Control Systems Society
 the 2016 Nyquist Lecture Prize from the Dynamical Systems and Control Division of the ASME
 the 2007 IROS Fumio Harashima Award for Innovative Technologies
 the O. Hugo Schuck Award in 2002 and 2009 from the American Automatic Control Council
 the 2004 John R. Ragazzini Award from the American Automatic Control Council
 the IEEE Third Millennium Medal.

Spong received his B.A. in Mathematics and Physics from Hiram College in 1975, a M.S. in Mathematics from New Mexico State University in 1977, and a M.S. and D.Sc. in Systems Science and Mathematics from Washington University in St. Louis in 1979 and 1981, respectively.

Publications 
 2015, Passivity-Based Control in Networked Robotics, with Takeshi Hatanaka, Nikhil Chopra, and Masayuki Fujita
 2007. The Reaction Wheel Pendulum, with D. J. Block and K. J. Astrom
 2006. Robot modeling and control. with S. Hutchinson and M. Vidyasagar
 1993. Robot control : dynamics, motion planning, and analysis with F.L. Lewis and C.T. Abdallah (ed.)
 1989. Robot dynamics and control. with M. Vidyasagar

External links
 Home page

1952 births
Control theorists
Hiram College alumni
New Mexico State University alumni
Washington University in St. Louis alumni
Washington University in St. Louis mathematicians
University of Illinois Urbana-Champaign faculty
University of Texas at Dallas faculty
Living people
American roboticists